The men's 200m individual medley events at the 2020 World Para Swimming European Championships were held at the Penteada Olympic Pools Complex.

Medalists

Results

SM6

SM7
Final

SM8

SM9

SM10
Heat 1

Final

SM11

SM13

SM14

References

2020 World Para Swimming European Championships